The Public Institution For Social Security (PIFSS; Arabic:المؤسسة العامة للتأمينات الاجتماعية‎) is the public pension fund of the state of Kuwait, it was founded in 1955 and counts 11 subsidiaries and 45 documented transactions. In 2021, its cash reserves accounted to 4% of its investments down from 11.5% in 2020.

The current worth of the assets of the PIFSS is estimated at $134 billion. It recorded its best ever annual performance year in 2021, recording a 20.9% growth in its assets.

Investments 
The pension fund owns 25% of the U.S. private equity firm Stone Point Capital, 25% of Oak Hill Advisors and 10% of TowerBrook Capital Partners.

References 

Government of Kuwait
Social security